Eric Jones (born 21 September 1936) is a British-Australian economist and historian, known for his 1981 book The European Miracle.

Jones received a doctorate in economic history from the Oxford University. From 1970 to 1975, he was professor of economics at Northwestern University in United States. From 1975 to 1994 he was a professor of economics and economics history at La Trobe University, in Australia. Jones has also had visiting appointments at Yale, Manchester, Princeton, University of Berlin and the Center for Economic Studies at Munich.

As of the early 2000s, he is Emeritus Professor of Economic Systems and Ideas at La Trobe University, and he holds a half-time Professorial Fellow position at the Melbourne Business School of the University of Melbourne in Australia and the part-time Professor of Economics position at the Graduate Center of International Business of the University of Reading in the United Kingdom.

Jones has also acted as a consultant for businesses and international organizations such as the World Bank.

Work
Eric Jones specialized in economic history, global economics, international affairs and economic systems, particularly in those of the Asian-Pacific region.

Eric Jones is the author of numerous articles and several books.

His most notable work is The European Miracle: Environments, Economies and Geopolitics in the History of Europe and Asia book (published in 1981).  The work popularized the term European miracle, but it also proved controversial, with some scholars describing his interpretation as 'Eurocentric'.

In Growth Recurring (1988) Jones focused on the states system theory as the decisive factor in the development of the West.

Bibliography

Books
The European Miracle: Environments, Economies and Geopolitics in the History of Europe and Asia, Cambridge University Press 1981
Growth Recurring (1988)
Cultures Merging: a historical and economic critique of culture (2006)

Book reviews

References

1936 births
Living people
British economists
Australian economists
British historians
Australian historians
Economic historians
Quadrant (magazine) people
Alumni of Nuffield College, Oxford
Fellows of Nuffield College, Oxford